The 1972 European Cup final was a football match held at De Kuip, Rotterdam, on 31 May 1972, that was contested between AFC Ajax of the Netherlands and Internazionale of Italy to determine the champion of the 1971–72 European Cup. Ajax defeated Inter by a score of 2–0 to claim their second successive European Cup victory, following their triumph in the 1971 final. Two second-half goals from forward Johan Cruyff provided the margin of victory for the Dutch side.

This game is often said to be Total Football's greatest moment; Ajax dominated much of the game as Inter defended desperately with their catenaccio strategy.

Route to the final

Match

Details

See also
1971–72 European Cup
AFC Ajax in European football
Inter Milan in European football

References

External links
1971-72 season at UEFA website

1
European Cup Final 1972
European Cup Final 1972
European Cup Final 1972
1972
Euro
Euro
European Cup Final
Sports competitions in Rotterdam
20th century in Rotterdam